The Water is a 2022 internationally co-produced drama film with magic realism elements directed by Elena López Riera in her directorial debut feature which stars Luna Pamies, Bárbara Lennie and Nieve de Medina. It is a joint Swiss-Spanish-French production.

Plot 
Set in southeastern Spain, with the backdrop of a local superstition concerning women being predestined to drown in river floods, the plot follows Ana, who lives with her mother and her grandmother, while the storm is coming.

Cast

Production 
The screenplay was penned by Elena López Riera alongside . Shooting took place in Orihuela and other locations across the province of Alicante from April to May 2021. Giuseppe Truppi took over the cinematography whereas Raphaël Lefèvre did so with the film editing.

Release 
The film had its world premiere on 20 May 2022 at the Directors' Fortnight parallel section of the 75th Cannes Film Festival. It will have its North-American premiere at the 2022 Toronto International Film Festival as part of the 'Contemporary World Cinema' film slate.

Filmin and Elastica scooped the distribution rights for Spain, where the film is scheduled to be theatrically released on 28 October 2022.

Reception 
On the American review aggregation website Rotten Tomatoes, The Water has a 100% approval rating based on 13 reviews from critics, with an average rating of 7.8/10.

Jonathan Holland of ScreenDaily deemed the film to be a "daring, multi-layered debut feature", also writing that "[The Water is] a film which always feels carefully poised on the edge of the surreal, where dark things always seem to be pressing in".

Manu Yáñez of Fotogramas rated the film 4 out of 5 stars, extolling the "audacity" of Elena López Riera at handling and intermingling the elements of the film.

Elsa Fernández-Santos of El País deemed the "suggestive" debut feature to be "a film where the arcane becomes visible in a subtle and interior way".

Top ten lists 
The film appeared on a number of critics' top ten lists of the best Spanish films of 2022:

Accolades 

|-
| rowspan = "8" align = "center" | 2022 || 27th Toulouse Spanish Film Festival || colspan = "2" | Golden Violet ||  || align = "center" | 
|-
| rowspan = "6" | 5th Berlanga Awards || colspan = "2" | Best Film ||  || rowspan = "6" | 
|-
| Best Director || Elena López Riera || 
|-
| Best Screenplay || Elena López Riera || 
|-
| Best Actress || Luna Pamies || 
|-
| Best Supporting Actress || Lidia María Cánovas || 
|-
| Best Supporting Actor || Pascual Valero || 
|-
| 16th Lisbon & Sintra Film Festival || colspan = "2" | Special Jury Prize (New Film) ||  || 
|-
| rowspan = "6" align = "center" | 2023
| 10th Feroz Awards || colspan = "2" | Arrebato Award (Fiction) ||  || align = "center" | 
|-
| rowspan = "2" | 78th CEC Medals || Best New Director || Elena López Riera ||  || rowspan = "2" | 
|-
| Best Supporting Actress || Bárbara Lennie || 
|-
| rowspan = "2" | 37th Goya Awards
| Best New Director || Elena López Riera
| 
| rowspan = "2" align = "center" |  
|-
| Best New Actress || Luna Pamies || 
|}

See also 
 List of Spanish films of 2022

References 

2022 films
2022 drama films
Swiss drama films
Spanish drama films
French drama films
Films shot in the province of Alicante
Films set in Spain
2020s Spanish-language films
2022 directorial debut films
2020s Spanish films
Magic realism films
2020s French films